Jewel De'Nyle is an American pornographic actress and director. She is a member of the NightMoves, AVN, and XRCO Halls of Fame.

Career
In 2000, De'Nyle made her directorial debut with XXXtreme Fantasies of Jewel De'Nyle for New Sensations before parting ways with the studio. Later that year, she co-wrote and co-produced Bound by Blood for Extreme Associates and started a series for Jill Kelly Productions titled Sluts of the Nyle.

Her mother was also a pornographic actress going by the name De'Bella. By the start of the 2008 AVN Adult Entertainment Expo they had reconciled their differences, with De'Nyle saying that the biggest part of their reconciliation came when De'Bella left Platinum X Pictures.

In January 2003, she became a founding part-owner of the porn studio Platinum X Pictures, located in the San Fernando Valley of California. De'Nyle left Platinum X in June 2006.

Personal life
De'Nyle was born to Debbie Schwarz, who was 19 at the time of her birth. De'Nyle was later adopted by Larry Jack Schwarz, a former Republican Colorado state legislator. She was the co-owner of Platinum X Productions while her mother was the sales director.

In September 2005, she was reported to be "newly married" in New York.

Awards

References

External links

 Jewel Denyle Bio
 
 
 
 

Year of birth missing (living people)
American pornographic film actresses
American pornographic film directors
American pornographic film producers
Living people
Women pornographic film directors
Women pornographic film producers
21st-century American women